St Margaret's Church, Norwich is a Grade I listed redundant parish church in the Church of England in Norwich.

History

The church is medieval. It was closed for five or six years and reopened after a restoration in 1868.

Much of its stained glass dating from the Victorian era was destroyed in a bombing raid in World War II. The east window was replaced in the 1960s with an Ascension scene by David King.

On being made redundant as a place of worship, it was then used as a gymnasium but more recently has been used for exhibitions and antiques markets.

References

Margaret
Grade I listed buildings in Norfolk